Electrum is a naturally occurring alloy of gold and silver, with trace amounts of copper and other metals. Its color ranges from pale to bright yellow, depending on the proportions of gold and silver. It has been produced artificially, and is also known as "green gold".

Electrum was used as early as the third millennium BC in Old Kingdom of Egypt, sometimes as an exterior coating to the pyramidions atop ancient Egyptian pyramids and obelisks. It was also used in the making of ancient drinking vessels. The first known metal coins made were of electrum, dating back to the end of the 7th century or the beginning of the 6th century BC. For several decades, the medals awarded with the Nobel Prize have been made of gold-plated green gold.

Etymology
The name "electrum" is the Latinized form of the Greek word ἤλεκτρον (ḗlektron), mentioned in the Odyssey referring to a metallic substance consisting of gold alloyed with silver. The same word was also used for the substance amber, likely because of the pale yellow color of certain varieties. It is from amber’s electrostatic properties that the modern English words "electron" and "electricity" are derived. Electrum was often referred to as "white gold" in ancient times, but could be more accurately described as "pale gold", as it is usually pale yellow or yellowish-white in color. The modern use of the term white gold usually concerns gold alloyed with any one or a combination of nickel, silver, platinum and palladium to produce a silver-colored gold.

Composition
Electrum consists primarily of gold and silver but is sometimes found with traces of platinum, copper, and other metals.  The name is mostly applied informally to compositions between about 20–80% gold and 20–80% silver, but these are strictly called gold or silver depending on the dominant element. Analysis of the composition of electrum in ancient Greek coinage dating from about 600 BC shows that the gold content was about 55.5% in the coinage issued by Phocaea. In the early classical period, the gold content of electrum ranged from 46% in Phokaia to 43% in Mytilene. In later coinage from these areas, dating to 326 BC, the gold content averaged 40% to 41%. In the Hellenistic period, electrum coins with a regularly decreasing proportion of gold were issued by the Carthaginians. In the later Eastern Roman Empire controlled from Constantinople, the purity of the gold coinage was reduced, and an alloy that can be called electrum began to be used.

History

Electrum is mentioned in an account of an expedition sent by Pharaoh Sahure of the Fifth Dynasty of Egypt. It is also discussed by Pliny the Elder in his Naturalis Historia. Electrum is also mentioned in the Hebrew Scriptures, whose prophet Ezekiel is said to have had a vision of Jehovah on a celestial chariot (Ezekiel 1:4).

Early coinage
The earliest known electrum coins, Lydian and East Greek coins found under the Temple of Artemis at Ephesus, are currently dated to the last quarter of the 7th century BC (625–600 BC). Electrum is believed to have been used in coins c. 600 BC in Lydia during the reign of Alyattes.

Electrum was much better for coinage than gold, mostly because it was harder and more durable, but also because techniques for refining gold were not widespread at the time. The discrepancy between gold content of electrum from modern Western Anatolia (70–90%) and ancient Lydian coinage (45–55%) suggests that the Lydians had already solved the refining technology for silver and were adding refined silver to the local native electrum some decades before introducing the pure silver coins cited below.

In Lydia, electrum was minted into coins weighing , each valued at  stater (meaning "standard"). Three of these coins—with a weight of about —totaled one stater, about one month's pay for a soldier. Larger denominations, such as a one stater coin, were minted as well.

Because of variation in the composition of electrum, it was difficult to determine the exact worth of each coin. Widespread trading was hampered by this problem, as the intrinsic value of each electrum coin could not be easily determined. The gold content of naturally occurring electrum in modern Western Anatolia ranges from 70% to 90%, in contrast to the 45–55% of gold in electrum used in ancient Lydian coinage of the same geographical area. This suggests that one reason for the invention of coinage in that area was to increase the profits from seigniorage by issuing currency with a lower gold content than the commonly circulating metal. (See also debasement).

These difficulties were eliminated circa 570 BC when the Croeseids, coins of pure gold and silver, were introduced. However, electrum currency remained common until approximately 350 BC. The simplest reason for this was that, because of the gold content, one 14.1 gram stater was worth as much as ten 14.1 gram silver pieces.

See also
Corinthian bronze – a highly prized alloy in antiquity, which may have contained electrum
Gold
Hepatizon
List of alloys
Orichalcum – another distinct metal or alloy mentioned in texts from classical antiquity, later used to refer to brass
Panchaloha
Shakudō – a Japanese billon of gold and copper with a dark blue-purple patina
Shibuichi – another Japanese alloy known for its patina
Silver
Thokcha – an alloy of meteoric iron or "thunderbolt iron" commonly used in Tibet
Tumbaga – a similar material, originating in Pre-Columbian America

References

External links 

 Electrum lion coins of the ancient Lydians (about 600 BC)
 An image of the obverse of a Lydian coin made of electrum

Gold
Coinage metals and alloys
Precious metal alloys
Silver
Copper alloys